Hristov or Khristov is a Bulgarian surname meaning "son of Hristo" or "Hristo's". The female version of the surname is Hristova (also spelled Khristova), which may refer to:

Hristov/Khristov
 Aleksandar Khristov (born 1964), Bulgarian boxer
 Andrea Hristov (born 1999), Bulgarian footballer
 Dobri Hristov (1875-1941), Bulgarian composer
 Gjorgji Hristov (born 1976), Macedonian footballer
 Lazar Khristov (born 1954), Bulgarian sprint canoer
 Marian Hristov (born 1973), Bulgarian footballer
 Petko Hristov (born 1999), Bulgarian footballer
 Raycho Khristov (born 1945), Bulgarian Olympic gymnast
 Valentin Hristov (born 1956), Bulgarian weightlifter
 Valentin Hristov (born 1994), Bulgarian-born Azerbaijani weightlifter

Hristova/Khristova
 Hristina Hristova (born 1954), Bulgarian politician and former MEP
 Ivanka Khristova (born 1941), Bulgarian shot putter
 Magdalena Khristova (born 1977), Bulgarian long jumper and sprinter
 Tsvetanka Khristova (1962–2008), Bulgarian discus thrower

See also
 Bulgarian surname

Bulgarian-language surnames
Macedonian-language surnames
Patronymic surnames